The Greeks of Albania are ethnic Greeks who live in or originate from areas within modern Albania. After ethnic Albanians, they form the second largest ethnic group in the country. They are mostly concentrated in the south of the country, in the areas of the northern part of the historical region of Epirus, in parts of Vlorë County, Gjirokastër, Korçë and Berat County. The area is also known as Northern Epirus. Consequently, the Greeks hailing specifically from Southern Albania are also known as Northern Epirotes ( Vorioipirotes). The Greeks who live in the "minority zones" of Albania are officially recognised by the Albanian government as the Greek National Minority of Albania (Elliniki Mionotita stin Alvania).

In 1913, after the end of five centuries of Ottoman rule, the area was included under the sovereignty of the newly founded Albanian state. The following year, Greeks revolted and declared their independence, and with the following Protocol of Corfu the area was recognised as an autonomous region under nominal Albanian sovereignty. However, this was never implemented.

In modern times, the Greek population has suffered from the prohibition of the Greek language if spoken outside the recognised so-called "minority zones" (which have remained after the communist era) and even limitations on the official use of its language within those zones. Many formerly Greek place-names have been officially changed to Albanian ones. Greeks from the "minority zones" were also frequently forcibly moved to other parts of the country since they were seen as possible sources of dissent and ethnic tension. In post-1990 era, these issues, including the emerging subject of private property rights, continue to persist to an extent.

Both Albania and Greece hold different and often conflicting estimations, as they have done so for the last 20 years. Most Western sources put the number at around 200,000. The Albanian government in the 1989 census estimated around 60,000, while the Greek government supports a figure of 300,000.  Furthermore, 13,329 ethnic Greeks with Albanian citizenship reside in Greece, and are issued special identity cards as of 2022. It has been suggested that some Albanians and Aromanians have claimed to be Greeks in exchange for economic benefits in Greece such as work permits and pensions and that it allegedly had "encouraged" the irredentism in North Epirus.

Northern Epirus 

The Greek minority in Albania is concentrated in the south of the country, along the border with Greece, an area referred to by Greeks as "Northern Epirus". The largest concentration is in the districts of Sarandë, Gjirokastër (especially in the area of Dropull), Delvinë and in Himara (part of the district of Vlorë). Smaller groups can be found in the districts of Kolonjë, Përmet and Korçë. In more recent times, the numbers of the minority have dwindled. According to an estimate in 2005 more than 80% have migrated to Greece. However, in more recent years the majority of emigrants holding Albanian citizenship in general dropped and many of them eventually returned from Greece to Albania. As a result, in regions such as Himara, part of the ethnic Greek communities that initially moved to Greece have returned.

Recognised Greek "minority zone" 

The communist government (1945–1991), in order to establish control over the areas populated by the Greek minority, declared the so-called "minority zones", consisting of 99 villages in the southern districts of Gjirokastër, Sarandë and Delvina.

Tirana's official minority policy defines the Greek origin of Albanian citizens according to the language, religion, birth and ancestors originating from the areas of the so-called "minority zones". The Albanian law on minorities acknowledges the rights of the Greek minority only to those people who live in the areas which are recognized as minority zones. The last census that included ethnicity, from 1989, included only the numbers of the Greek minority in the minority zones. Ethnic Greeks living outside those areas were not counted as such. This has had a practical effect in the area of education: With the exception of the officially recognized Greek minority zones, where teaching was held in both the Greek and Albanian languages, in all other areas of Albania lessons were taught only in the Albanian language.

Aromanians 

Work in Greece is of importance in Albania, and people who declare to be members of the Greek minority or prove their "Greek origin", receive special benefits and identity cards. A substantial number of Aromanians (Vlachs) in south-eastern Albania, as well as some Muslim Albanians, have claimed Greek identity based on pro-Greek social networks and identity idioms of the past. Also, Aromanians from villages around Vlorë, who identified as "Helleno-Vlach", were able to obtain visas and work permits without any difficulties. It has been suggested that a certain number of Aromanians have claimed to be Greek in exchange for benefits; such as Greek pensions, passports and visas.

Other Greek communities in Albania 

However, the official Albanian definition about minorities did not recognize as members of a minority ethnic Greeks who live in mixed villages and towns inhabited by both Greek and Albanian speaking populations, even in areas where ethnic Greeks form a majority (e.g. Himara). Consequently, the Greek communities in Himarë, Korçë, Vlorë and Berat did not have access to any minority rights.

Contrary to the official Albanian definition, which generally provides a limited definition of the ethnic Greeks living in Albania, Greek migration policy defines the Greek origin on the basis of language, religion, birth and ancestors from the region called Northern Epirus. In that way, according to the Greek State Council, the Greek ethnic origin can be granted on the basis of cultural ancestry (sharing "common historical memories" and/or links with "historic homelands and culture"), Greek descent (Greek Albanians have to prove that the birthplace of their parents or grandparents is in Northern Epirus), language, and religion.

It has been noted that Albanians have declared themselves as Greeks in the past 20 years in exchange to reside and work in Greece. This allegedly encouraged the process of Greek irredentism in "Northern Epirus".Albanian sources often use the pejorative term filogrek (pro-Greek) in relation to ethnic Greeks, usually in a context disputing their Greek ancestry.

The Greek minority in Albania is located mostly compactly, within the wider Gjirokastër and Sarandë regions and in four settlements within the coastal Himarë area where they form an overall majority population. Greek speaking settlements are also found within Përmet municipality, near the border. Some Greek speakers are also located within the wider Korçë region. Due to both forced and voluntary internal migration of Greeks within Albania during the communist era, some Greek speakers are also located within the wider Përmet and Tepelenë regions. Outside the area defined as Northern Epirus, two coastal Greek speaking villages exist near Vlorë; Nartë and Zvërnec. While due to forced and non-forced internal population movements of Greeks within Albania during the communist era, some Greek speakers are also dispersed within the Berat region.

Human rights violations in Albania 

Human rights in Albania are violated by the Government which have targeted the Greek population via police and secret service according to Human Rights organisations. Greek communities have been targeted by development projects and had their homes demolished in alleged ethnic targeting of Greeks from Southern Albania.
Also, according to Amnesty International there were cases of mistreatment of members of Greek minority by the authorities.

Also, the ethnic Greek minority complained about the government's unwillingness to recognize ethnic Greek towns outside communist-era "minority zones," to utilize Greek in official documents and on public signs in ethnic Greek areas, or to include more ethnic Greeks in public administration.

The 2012 USA annual report mention that the emergence of strident nationalist groups like the Red and Black Alliance (RBA) increased ethnic tensions with the Greek minority groups.

Diaspora

Greece 

At the end of the Second World War, approximately 35,000 Northern Epirotes found refuge in Greece.

A special ID card for ethnic Greeks from Albania was issued in 2001 which was received by  189,000 individuals who resided in Greece at the time. For ethnic Greeks from Albania this measure was seen as treating them as "lower class citizens" as in order to obtain it their "Greekness" was examined in the form of a questionnaire. Another issue with the special ID card had to do with ethnic Albanians using fake documents which presented them as members of the Greek minority to obtain it. In 2008, the citizenship law change in Greece allowed for holders of special ID cards to obtain Greek citizenship and about 45,000 did so just in the first three years of its implementation. The Omonoia organization put the number at 287,000 after their so called "Greek census" in 2013. This census is not recognised by the Albanian government. , the number of Albanian citizens who are holders of special IDs as homogeneis (Greek co-ethnics) has been reduced to 13,329.

North America 
A number of Northern Epirotes have migrated since the late 19th century to the Americas, and are generally integrated in the local Greek-American communities. The Pan-Epirotic Union of America, an organization which consists of 26 branches in various cities, according to its estimates counted nearly 30,000 Northern Epirotes in North America in 1919.

According to post-war sources, Northern Epirotes in America numbered over 15,000 families in 1965.

Australia 
Northern Epirotes also emigrated to Australia, where they are active in raising political issues related to their motherland and the rights of the Greek populations still living there. The largest number of such persons are in the state of Victoria.

Culture

Language 

The Greek dialects of Albania mainly belong to the branch of southern Greek dialects. In addition to Albanian loanwords, they retain some archaic forms and words that are no longer used in Standard Modern Greek, as well as in the Greek dialects of southern Epirus. Despite the relatively small distances between the various town and villages, there exists some dialectal variation, most noticeably in accent. Though Northern Epirote is a southern dialect, it is located far north of the reduced unstressed vowel system isogloss with the archaic disyllabic -ea. Thus, the provenance of the dialect ultimately remains obscure.

The local Greek dialects (especially the idioms of Chimariotic and the Argyrokastritic) are a more conservative Greek idiom (similarly to that spoken in the Mani peninsula in Greece, and the Griko language of Apulia in Italy), because they were spoken by populations living under virtual autonomy during Ottoman rule due to the rugged nature of the region. Thus, separated from other Greek dialects, the Northern Epirote Greek dialects underwent slower evolution, preserving a more archaic and faithful picture of the medieval Greek vernacular.  The isolation of Albania during the years of communist rule, which separated the Greeks living in Albania from other Greek communities, also contributed to the slower evolution and differentiation of the local Greek dialects.

The Greek dialect of Nartë and Zvërnec is characterized by northern vocalism. It is a conservative dialect, and has some isoglosses with the Greek dialects of southern Italy, Ionian Islands, Epirus, but also with more distant Greek-speaking regions, such as Cyprus, Thrace and Asia Minor.

Decent knowledge of Albanian is also common amongst the Greek minority; almost all Greeks who have grown up living in Albania are bilingual.

Music 

Epirote' folk music from this region has several unique features not found in the rest of the Greek world. Singers from the Pogon region (as well as in the Greek part of Upper Pogoni) perform a style of polyphony that is characterized by a pentatonic structure, and also appears in the music of nearby Albanian and Aromanian populations. Another type of polyphonic singing in the region seems to have features in common with the lament songs sung in some parts of Greece. The female lament singing of Greeks in Albania is similar in nature and performance with that of the Mani peninsula in Greece.
In recent years there has been a growing interest in polyphonic music from this region, most notably by the musician Kostas Lolis, born near Sopik in Albania but now lives in Ioannina, in Greece.

Religion 

Christianity spread in the late Roman Empire, and throughout much of Medieval and Modern history, the Christian faith has been a significant part of the identity of Greeks in what became Albania and elsewhere. After the Great Schism, Albania was divided between the Western (Catholic) and Eastern (Orthodox) rites, with much of the Southern regions where Greeks resided being loyal to the Orthodox rite. During the Ottoman era, the Orthodox population, to which most Greeks belonged, was treated according to the Ottoman millet system which privileged Muslims and disadvantaged Christians as second class citizens who received fewer political, social, and economic rights. Orthodox Christianity during the Ottoman period remained dominant in many areas and became an important reason for preserving the Greek language, which was also the language of trade. In Himara, during part of this period, the local Greek population were Catholics of the Eastern rite due to alliances with Western and Catholic European powers, although they reverted to Greek Orthodoxy ultimately. Greek-Orthodox missionary Cosmas of Aetolia traveled across much of Southern Albania in a mission to preserve the Orthodox faith there, and was executed as a Russian agent in the process. Due to reforms in the late Ottoman Empire and its ultimate collapse, legal discrimination against Christians in favor of Muslims was reduced and ceased entirely in the late 19th and early 20th centuries.

Under the People's Republic of Albania, the Orthodox faith adhered to by most ethnic Greeks was banned entirely alongside the other religious faiths all over the country. The process started in 1949, with the confiscation and nationalisation of Church property and further intensified in 1967, when the state launched its atheistic campaign. However, some private practice managed to survive. This campaign was also part of the state persecution against the identity of the Greek people; as many of their traditions were closely related to Eastern Christianity.

The ban was lifted in 1990 just in time for Christians to observe traditional Christmas rites. Thus, one of the first Orthodox masses was celebrated in the town of Dervican on 16 December of that year.

Education

Ottoman era 

During the first period of Ottoman occupation, illiteracy was a main characteristic of the wider Balkan region, but contrary to that situation, Epirus was not negatively affected. Along with the tolerance of the Turkish rulers and the desires of wealthy Epirote emigrants in the diaspora, many schools were established.

The spiritual and ethnic contribution of the monastery schools in Epirus such as Katsimani (near Butrint), Drianou (in Droviani), Kamenas (in Delvina) and St. Athanasios in Poliçani (13th-17th century) was significant. The first Greek-language school in Delvine was founded in 1537, when the town was still under Venetian control, while in Gjirokastër a Greek school was founded in 1633. The most important impetus for the creation of schools and the development of Greek education was given by the Orthodox missionary Cosmas of Aetolia together with the Aromanian Nektarios Terpos from Moscopole. Cosmas the Aetolian founded the Acroceraunian School, harkening back to the region's name in classical antiquity, in the town of Himara in 1770.

In Moscopole, an educational institution known as the "New Academy" and an extensive library were established during the 18th century. A local monk founded in 1731 the first printing house in the Balkans (second only to that of Constantinople). However, after the destruction of Moscopole (1769), the center of Greek education in the region moved to nearby Korçë.

In the late 19th century, the wealthy banker Christakis Zografos founded the Zographeion College in his hometown of Qestorat, in the region of Lunxhëri. Many of the educated men that supported Greek culture and education in the region, then the culture of the Orthodox Patriarchate, were Aromanians by origin. In 1905, Greek education was flourishing in the region, as the entire Orthodox population, including Orthodox Albanians, were educated in Greek schools.

However, in the northernmost districts of Berat and Durrës, the above numbers do not reflect the ethnological distribution, because a large number of students were Orthodox Albanians.

20th century Albania (1912–1991) 
When Albania was created in 1912, the educational rights of the Greek communities in Albanian territory were granted by the Protocol of Corfu (1914) and with the statement of Albania's representatives in the League of Nations (1921). However, under a policy of assimilation, the Greek schools (there were over 360 until 1913) were gradually forced to close and Greek education was virtually eliminated by 1934.  Following the intervention by the League of Nations, a limited number of schools, only those inside the "official minority zones", were reopened.

During the years of the communist regime, Greek education was also limited to the so-called "minority zone", and even then pupils were taught only Albanian history and culture at the primary level. If a few Albanian families moved into a town or village, the minority's right to be educated in Greek and publish in Greek newspapers was revoked.

Post cold war period (1991–present) 
One of the major issues between the Albanian government and the Greek minority in Albania is that of education and the need for more Greek-language schools, due to overcrowded classrooms and unfulfilled demand. In addition, the Greek minority remands that Greek language education be made available outside the "official minority zones". In 2006, the establishment of a Greek-language university in Gjirokastër was agreed upon after discussions between the Albanian and Greek government. Also in 2006, after years of unanswered demands by the local community, a private Greek-language school opened in the town of Himarë, at the precise location where the Orthodox missionary Cosmas the Aetolian founded the Acroceraunian School. The school currently has five teachers and 115 pupils. The Albanian government systematically persecutes Greek communities using mandatory demolition orders, further provocation has come on issuing the demolition orders on Greek national holidays. These are often under the proviso of development but only effect ethnic Greeks and restrict and target educational buildings.

Benefaction 

A number of people from the prosperous Northern Epirote diaspora of the 18th-19th centuries made significant contributions not only to their homeland, but also to the Greek state and to the Greek world under Ottoman Turkish domination. They donated fortunes for the construction of educational, cultural and social institutions. The Sinas family supported the expansion of the University of Athens and sponsored the foundation of the National Observatory. Ioannis Pangas from Korcë gave all of his wealth for educational purposes in Greece. The Zappas brothers, Evangelos and Konstantinos, endowed Athens with an ancient Greek-style marble stadium (the Kallimarmaro) that has hosted Olympic Games in 1870, 1875, 1896, 1906 and 2004, and the Zappeion exhibition center.  The Zappas brothers also founded a number of hospitals and schools in Athens and Constantinople. Christakis Zografos in the Ottoman capital offered vast amounts of money for the establishments of two Greek schools (one for boys, known as Zographeion Lyceum, as well as one for girls), and a hospital.

Organizations

Albania 

During the years of communist rule, any form of organization by minorities was prohibited. In 1991, when the communist regime collapsed, the political organization Omonoia was founded, in the town of Dervican by representatives of the Greek minority. The organization has four affiliates, in Sarandë, Delvinë, Gjirokastër and Tirana, and sub-sections in Korçë, Vlorë and Përmet. Its leading forum is the General Council consisting of 45 members, which is elected by the General Conference held every two years.

The Chair of Omonoia called for the autonomy of Northern Epirus in 1991, on the basis that the rights of the minority under the Albanian constitution were highly precarious. This proposal was rejected and thereby spurred the organization's radical wing to "call for Union with Greece".

Omonoia was banned from the parliamentary elections of March 1991 on the grounds that it violated an Albanian law forbidding the "formation of parties on a religious, ethnic and regional basis". This situation was contested during the following elections on behalf of Omonoia by the Unity for Human Rights Party – a party which represents the Greek minority in the Albanian parliament. Omonoia still exists as an umbrella social and political organization, and represents approximately 100,000 to 150,000 ethnic Greeks.

Omonoia has been the center of more than one political controversy in Albania. A major political controversy erupted in 1994 when five ethnic Greek members of Omonoia were arrested, investigated, and tried for treason. Their arrest was substantially marred by procedural shortcomings in the search of their homes and offices, their detention, and their trial. None of the arrestees had access to legal counsel during their initial detention. Four of the five ethnic Greek members of Omonoia stated that, during their detention, authorities subjected them to physical and psychological pressure, including beatings, sleep deprivation, and threats of torture. The Albanian Government rejected these claims. The five ethnic Greeks also complained of lack of access to their families during the first 3 months of their 4-month investigation. During their trial, a demonstration by a group of about 100 Greek lawyers, journalists, and ethnic Greek citizens of Albania took place outside the courthouse. The Albanian Police violently broke up the protest and detained about 20 lawyers and journalists. The members of Omonoia were eventually sentenced to 6 to 8-year prison terms, which were subsequently reduced on appeal.

North America 
The Panepirotic Federation of America was founded in Worcester, Massachusetts, in 1942, by Greek immigrants from Epirus (both from the Greek and Albanian part). One of the organization's main goals has been the protection of the human rights of the Greek minority in Albania and to call on the Albanian Government to enhance its full acceptance within the community of responsible nations by restoring to the Greek minority its educational, religious, political, linguistic and cultural rights due them under bilateral and international agreements signed by Albania's representatives since the country was created in 1913, including the right to declare their ethnic and religious affiliation in a census monitored by international observers.

Australia 
The Panepirotic Federation of Australia was founded in 1982 as a Federation of various organizations representing migrants who originated from the region of Epirus throughout Australia. It is known for its dedication to the maintenance and development of Epirotic culture in Australia, its passionate championing of the rights of the Greek minority of Northern Epirus, and plays a prominent role in the life of the Greek community in Australia. It has donated over one million dollars to works of a charitable and philanthropic nature for the Greeks of Northern Epirus. It is also affiliated with the World Council of Epirotes Abroad and the World Council of Hellenes Abroad.

The Panepirotic Federation of Australia's former president, Mr Petros Petranis has notably completed a study of Epirotic migration to Australia, which is titled "Epirots in Australia" (Greek: Οι Ηπειρώτες στην Αυστραλία), published by the National Centre for Hellenic Studies, La Trobe University, in 2004.

Notable people

Academics 
 Charles Moskos (1934–2008), sociologist and professor
 Vasileios Ioannidis (1869–1963), theologian
 Tasos Vidouris (1888–1967), professor and poet

Literature and art 
 Stavrianos Vistiaris, 16th century poet
 Kosmas Thesprotos (1780–1852)
 Konstantinos Skenderis, journalist, author and member of the Greek Parliament (1915–1917) for the Korytsa Prefecture
 Theophrastos Georgiadis (1885–1973), author
 Katina Papa (1903–1959), author
 Michele Greco da Valona, 15th-16th century painter.
 Michael Vasileiou, entrepreneur and scholar
 Konstantinos Kalymnios, poet
 Takis Tsiakos (1909–1997), poet
 Rita Wilson, actress and producer
 Laert Vasili, actor and director

Military/resistance 
 Konstantinos Lagoumitzis (1781–1827), revolutionary
 Kyriakoulis Argyrokastritis (-1828), revolutionary
 Michail Spyromilios (1800–1880), army General, military advisor and politician
 Zachos Milios (1805–1860), army officer
 Ioannis Poutetsis (-1912), revolutionary
 Spyros Spyromilios (1864–1930), Gendarmerie officer
 Dimitrios Doulis (1865–1928), army officer, minister of military affairs of the Autonomous Rep. of Northern Epirus
 Nikolaos Dailakis ( -1941), revolutionary of the Macedonian Struggle
 Vasilios Sahinis (1897–1943), leader of the Northern Epirote resistance (1942–1943)

Philanthropy 
 Alexandros Vasileiou (1760–1818)
 Apostolos Arsakis (1792–1874)
 Evangelis Zappas (1800–1865)
 Konstantinos Zappas (1814–1892)
 Ioannis Pangas (1814–1895)
 Georgios Sinas (1783–1856)
 Simon Sinas (1810–1876)
 Christakis Zografos (1820–1896)

Politics 
 Thanasis Vagias (1765–1834), counselor of Ali Pasha
 Kyriakos Kyritsis, lawyer and member of the Greek Parliament (1915–1917) for the Argyrokastron Prefecture
 Petros Zappas, member of the Greek Parliament (1915–1917) for the Argyrokastron Prefecture
 Georgios Christakis-Zografos (1863–1920), diplomat, president of the Provisional Government of Northern Epirus (1914)
 Themistoklis Bamichas (1875–1930), politician
 Mihal Kasso, politician
 Spiro Koleka (1908–2001), long-serving member of the Politburo of the Party of Labour of Albania, one of the few members of the Greek minority serving in the Socialist People's Republic of Albaniapolitical system
 Kiço Mustaqi (1938-2019), last chief of general staff in communist Albania
 George Tenet (1953-), former Director of CIA, of Himariot origin
 Vasil Bollano (1958-), present chairman of Omonoia
 Spiro Ksera (1967-), former Minister of Labor, Social Affairs and Equal Opportunities of Albania and ex prefect of Gjirokastër County

Religion 
 Sophianos (-1711), bishop of Dryinoupolis and scholar, from Poliçan
 Vasileios of Dryinoupolis (1858–1936), bishop and member of the provisional government of Northern Epirus (1914)
 Ioakeim Martianos (1875–1955), bishop and author, from Moscopole
 Panteleimon Kotokos (1890–1969), bishop of Gjirokastër (1937–1941), from Korçë

Sports 
 Pyrros Dimas, Greek weight-lifer, Olympic medalist, born in Himarë
 Panajot Pano (1939–2010), footballer of Greek origin, born in Durrës
Ledio Pano, footballer of Greek origin
 Sotiris Ninis, Greek footballer, born in Himarë
 Andreas Tatos, Greek footballer, born in Himarë

See also 
 Albanian communities in Greece
 Arvanites
 Protocol of Corfu
 Demographics of Albania
 Thanas Ziko Battalion

Footnotes

References

Further reading 
 Austin, Robert. Kjellt Engelbrekt, and Duncan M. Perry. "Albania's Greek Minority". RFE/RL Research Report. Vol 3 Iss 11. 18 March 1994, pp. 19–24
 Berxolli, Arqile. Sejfi Protopapa, and Kristaq Prifti. "The Greek Minority in the Albanian Republic: A Demographic Study". Nationalities Papers 22, no.2, (1994)
 Filippatos, James. "Ethnic Identity and Political Stability in Albania: The Human Rights Status of the Greek Minority", Mediterranean Quarterly, Winter 1999, pp. 132–156
 

Albanian people of Greek descent
 
Ethnic groups in Albania